Mark van der Merwe (born 17 June 1970) is a South African former cricketer. He played in five first-class matches for Boland from 1990/91 to 1992/93.

See also
 List of Boland representative cricketers

References

External links
 

1970 births
Living people
South African cricketers
Boland cricketers
People from Strand, Western Cape
Cricketers from the Western Cape